Andy Christian Soucek (born 14 June 1985) is a Spanish-Austrian professional racing driver.

Career
Soucek was born in Madrid, Spain. His father is an Austrian of Czech descent and his mother is French. He holds dual Austrian and Spanish nationality, although he was born in Spain and has spent all his life there. He races under the Spanish flag because he "feels Spanish".

Karting
Soucek's career started in professional karting events during 1997, although he would not make a formula debut until his Portuguese Formula Ford drive of 2001. In 2002 he continued with karting whilst driving in Spanish Formula Three. In 2003 he ended his karting commitments, moving to the EV team.

Formula Three
He remained with EV during 2004 but would also drive two races for the GTA team. 2005 would be his key year, though, with Soucek's move to the Llusia team paying off after he won the title.

GP2 Series

After being in contention for the 2006 Championship in the World Series by Renault, Soucek signed to race in the GP2 Series for 2007 with the DPR team. He remained with DPR for the first round of the 2008 GP2 Asia Series, but was dropped after signing for rival team FMS International for the premier 2008 championship. Surprisingly, with only five days to the 2008 championship start, FMS International terminated Soucek's contract unilaterally, replacing him with fellow Spaniard Roldán Rodríguez . This left Soucek without time to find a new team in time for the season start. A legal dispute resulted between Soucek and FMS International.

However, he returned to race in the series after one round of the championship as a replacement for the injured Christian Bakkerud in the Super Nova team. After two races with Super Nova, Soucek then returned to the DPR team where he replaced Giacomo Ricci, himself substituting for the injured Michael Herck. and scoring his first championship point. Following his stint with DPR, Soucek returned once more to Super Nova as a permanent replacement for Bakkerud. He achieved one podium (at Hungaroring) and several more point finishes and ended the season tied with Roldán Rodríguez as best Spaniard.

Superleague Formula and Formula Two
Andy Soucek also represented the Brazilian side Corinthians (managed by EuroInternational group) in the 1st race of the 2008 Superleague Formula season, as Corinthians main driver Antônio Pizzonia was unable to participate, because of his schedule in Stock Car Brasil.

From the second race on, Soucek signed for Atlético Madrid to drive their car for the remainder of the 2008 Superleague Formula season.  

In 2009, Soucek raced in the newly revived FIA Formula Two Championship, driving car number 22. Soucek clinched the title with three races to spare.  As part of his prize for winning the championship, he tested for the Williams Formula One team on 1 December, setting the fastest time of the day.

Formula One testing
However Williams signed Valtteri Bottas as their official reserve and test driver. Soucek instead signed as a test driver for Virgin Racing, joining Luiz Razia in that role. In August, Soucek left Virgin, stating that the team had broken their contract by not giving him any testing opportunities. In September 2010 he returned to Superleague Formula, racing for Galatasaray.

Sportscar racing
Subsequently, Soucek switched to racing GTs, making his debut in the final round of the 2012 Blancpain Endurance Series season at the Circuito de Navarra for Boutsen-Ginion Racing, and joining ART Grand Prix to race a McLaren MP4-12C for the 2013 Blancpain Endurance season.

He co-founded Integrated Racing Performance, a racing driver consultancy company, with Derrick Vopelka and Jorge Gil in 2011.

Racing record

Complete Formula Renault 3.5 Series results
(key) (Races in bold indicate pole position) (Races in italics indicate fastest lap)

Complete GP2 Series results
(key) (Races in bold indicate pole position) (Races in italics indicate fastest lap)

Superleague Formula record
(Races in bold indicate pole position) (Races in italics indicate fastest lap)

Complete FIA Formula Two Championship results
(key) (Races in bold indicate pole position) (Races in italics indicate fastest lap)

Complete Blancpain GT Series Sprint Cup results

References

External links

 Personal web site In Spanish (clicking "Palmarés" key, there's a pdf CV also in English and German)

1985 births
Living people
Sportspeople from Madrid
Spanish people of Austrian descent
Spanish people of Czech descent
Spanish people of French descent
Austrian people of French descent
Austrian people of Czech descent
Austrian racing drivers
Spanish racing drivers
Euroformula Open Championship drivers
GP2 Series drivers
Superleague Formula drivers
FIA Formula Two Championship drivers
GP2 Asia Series drivers
World Series Formula V8 3.5 drivers
FIA GT1 World Championship drivers
Blancpain Endurance Series drivers
24 Hours of Spa drivers
GT World Challenge America drivers
Walter Lechner Racing drivers
David Price Racing drivers
Super Nova Racing drivers
Racing Engineering drivers
De Villota Motorsport drivers
Alan Docking Racing drivers
EuroInternational drivers
ART Grand Prix drivers
Nürburgring 24 Hours drivers
Boutsen Ginion Racing drivers
M-Sport drivers